Ultimate Factories, also known as Megafactories in non-US markets, is an American documentary television series that premiered in 2006 on the National Geographic Channel. The program explored the inner workings of factories worldwide. Each episode profiles the machinery and manpower behind each factory's main product, featuring close-ups, breakdowns, interviews, and side stories to show the sequence of events to produce the product in the factory.

History
National Geographic Megafactories was also broadcast under the name Ultimate Factories in the United States. The show was an hour long television program and they featured a variety of factories. National Geographic's camera crews were able to get raw footage for a one hour program in seven days.

Episodes
As of 11 August 2013, the National Geographic Channel has broadcast the following episodes of the series:

Season 1 (2006–2007)

Season 2 (2007–2008)

Season 3 (2009–2010)

Season 4 (2011)

Season 5 (2011-2012)
Because the season number, episode number and some of the airdates cannot be confirmed, these episodes are listed by their production / copyright year listed at the end of the credits of the show.

Season 6 (2013)
Because the season number, episode number and airdate cannot be confirmed, these episodes are listed by their production / copyright year listed at the end of the credits of the show

Reception
Kirby Garlitos from Top Speed said, because the show has featured exotic vehicles,  it has always been a hot ticket.

See also 
 Mega Builders

References

External links
 

2007 American television series debuts
2013 American television series endings
Documentary television series about industry
National Geographic (American TV channel) original programming